John Quarmby (18 June 1929 – 5 April 2019) was an English character actor.

Biography 
Quarmby was born in Liverpool and after two years' national service in the RAF joined RADA in 1949. Repertory work dominated the first twenty years of his career, although he began appearing in television in 1956.

Quarmby played a variety of roles from the 1960s to the 1990s appearing in many long-running drama series such as Z-Cars, Softly, Softly, Juliet Bravo and Howards' Way.  He also appeared in the 1982 television film The Scarlet Pimpernel. He appeared as a prison officer in Porridge in an episode entitled "The Hustler" (1974). He played the role of Mr Carnegie, the Health Inspector in the Fawlty Towers episode "Basil the Rat" (1979) and Henry Tobias (the newspaper editor) in K-9 and Company.

Selected filmography

References

External links

1929 births
2019 deaths
20th-century English male actors
English male television actors
Alumni of RADA
Male actors from Liverpool
English male stage actors
Royal Air Force airmen